Saada, a city and ancient capital in the northwest of Yemen, is the capital and largest city of the province of the same name, and the county seat of the county of the same name. The city is located in the mountains of Serat (Sarawat) at an altitude of about 1,800 meters and had an estimated population of 51,870 in 2004, when it was the tenth largest city in Yemen.

As early as the reign of the Main Kingdom, the earliest country in the history of Yemen, the area where Saada is located today was included in the national map of Yemen.

Sa'da is one of the earliest medieval cities in Yemen, the birthplace of the Shiite sect of Islam in Yemen and the base of the regime of the Zeid imam of Yemen. From the beginning of the 9th century to the 20th century, the Rasi dynasty, the longest reigning dynasty in Yemen history (the dynasty's direct line was replaced by the collateral dynasty Qassem dynasty since the end of the 16th century), made its fortune in Saada.

Saada is also the base camp of the Houthis and the birthplace of the Houthis movement. The Yemen Houthi rebellion that began in 2004 took the lead in Saada. Saada, which has been under the control of the Houthis since the end of the 2011 campaign, was the first city to break free from the central government in Yemen since the ongoing Yemen crisis.

History
About the 14th century BC, the Main people established the first country in the history of Yemen, the Main Kingdom, in the present-day Jawf area of Yemen (the eastern neighboring province of today's Saada Province). for Gaerneau. At its peak, the Main Kingdom started from Hadramaut in the south and reached Hejaz (Hijaz) in the north. Today, the area where Sadar is located is also within the territory of the Main Kingdom.

After the decline and fall of the Main Kingdom in the 7th century BC, Saada belonged to the Kingdom of Sheba, the Kingdom of Himyar, the Aksum Empire in Ethiopia, the Sassanid Dynasty in the Persian Empire, and the Arabian Kingdom. Empire. Less than 4 years after the establishment of the second dynasty of the Arab Empire, the Abbasid dynasty, due to the dissatisfaction of the Yemenis with the tyranny of the governor of the empire, the Saada region in the north of Yemen and the Hadramaut region in the south broke out against the rule of the Abbasid dynasty uprisings, but were eventually suppressed by the authorities.

In the later period of the Abbasid Dynasty, the warlords were divided, and the centralized power existed in name only, and various territories of the empire, including Yemen, established a group of independent or semi-independent regimes of the caliphate of Baghdad. At the beginning of the 9th century, the saint who lived in the holy city of Medina in Islam (the descendant of Hassan bin Ali, the second Shia imam who claimed to be the Hashemite family), the theologian Ka Sam Rassi formulated the teachings of Zaid, a Shiite sect. At the end of the 9th century, the grandson of Qasem Rassi, Yahya bin Hassan, decided to preach in Yemen and develop the cause of the Zaydis. In 893, Yahya came to the north of Yemen to promote the teachings of Zaydism, but at first he did not get the support of the local people, so he returned to his hometown of Medina. In 896, some tribal leaders from the Saada and Howran areas in northern Yemen invited Yahya to return to Yemen to mediate local tribal conflicts. In 897, Yahya returned to Saada with his uncle Muhammad bin Qasim (son of Qasim Rasi) and some other followers, successfully mediating the local tribal conflict and obtaining their Support and allegiance, and are embraced as their leader, titled "Imam Hadi" ("Imam" and "Hadi" both mean leader in Arabic). Imam Hadi Yahya ordered the construction of the city of Sa'da, where the Imam regime of the integration of state and religion was established, and Sa'da became the birthplace and permanent foothold of the Zayd faction in Yemen. The land, Saada is also the first surviving city with a unique Arab-Islamic architectural style, and the Zaydis are still one of the most influential Islamic sects in Yemen. Since Imam Hadi Yahya's hometown was in Ras Hills in Medina, his grandfather Qasem Rassi was named "Rasi" (Arabic means those who live in Ras Hills). Because of his nickname, the dynasty he created was called the "Lasi Dynasty". It was the longest reigning dynasty in Yemen's history (893-1962), more than a thousand years, and Sada was the birthplace of the Lassi Dynasty.

Since the founding of the city in the Middle Ages, Saada has been a trading hub for the export of goods north of Yemen to what is today Saudi Arabia. Caravans on the spice road pass through villages around Saada. The medieval old city of Saada was built in traditional ways, and around the old city there is a bustling new town with typical streets, garage-like workshops and typical Arabian-style shops.

After Imam Hadi Yahya died, his sons successively served as Imams, but the teachings of Zaid sect stipulate that as long as they are holy descendants (that is, descendants of Muhammad, the founder of Islam of the Hashemite family), they can be selected as Imams. Imams are not necessarily hereditary. Nonetheless, the vast majority of Yemen's imams are descendants of the Rathi dynasty (the collateral Qasim dynasty since 1597). The Yemeni Imam Dynasty ruled from time to time, and it has been conquered by foreign invaders such as the Fatimid Dynasty, the Ayyubid Dynasty, the Mamluk Sultanate and the Ottoman Empire, and it has also experienced Rasul The rule of Yemen native dynasties such as Dynasty and Tahir Dynasty, the succession of Laxi Dynasty was not continuous. Although Sa'da's status as the capital of the Imam's regime is often replaced by other cities (such as Sana, Sahara, Surah, Taiz, etc.), the mountainous northwest of Yemen where Sa'da is located has always been the Imam Dynasty the last fortress.

The Ottoman Empire was defeated and disintegrated in World War I, and the northern Yemen region under the former Ottoman Empire, including Saada, gained full independence in 1918. The Imam of the Qasem dynasty of the Zaydisi, Yahya Mohammad Hamid al-Din ("Imam Mutawakil"), announced the establishment of the Yemeni Mutawakiliya Kingdom, and put his respect No. is included in the country name. In September 1962, the "Freedom Officers" organization headed by Abdullah Selal launched a military coup in the capital, Sana, to overthrow the Qasem dynasty and establish the Arab Republic of Yemen. The Qassem royal family and the monarchist forces first fled from Sana to the northern mountainous area centered on Saada, and then to neighboring Saudi Arabia, where they fought against the republican faction together with the northern tribes who supported the royal family, thus setting off a long-term crisis. Eight years of civil war in North Yemen. Yemen's monarchists were supported by Saudi Arabia, which is also a monarchy, while the republicans were supported by the United Arab Republic led by President Nasser. Sent troops to North Yemen to help the Republic resist the Monarchist faction.

During the civil war, the Saada area, the former royal base and the stronghold of the Zaydis, was an important town for the struggle between the republicans and the monarchists. On February 18, 1963, the Egyptian Vice President and Defense Minister Field Marshal Amer commanded the North Yemen Republican Army to capture the city of Saada, and Saada has been under the control of the Republican since then. Although the republican faction and the monarchist faction changed their offensive and defensive positions several times, the republican faction, even when it was at a disadvantage, repelled the monarchy’s attack on Sada and successfully defended Sada. In July 1970, the civil war in North Yemen ended, the republican faction won the final victory, and the Arab Republic of Yemen was recognized by the international community, including Saudi Arabia. On May 22, 1990, the Arab Republic of Yemen in the north and the Democratic People's Republic of Yemen in the south announced their unification and established the Yemen Republic, and Sada has been under the rule of the Yemen Republic since then.

After the unification of Yemen from north to south, although the government of the Republic of Yemen achieved formal national unification, the northwestern mountainous area with Saada and its surrounding areas as the core, as the base camp of the former royal family and the Zayde faction, was basically neglected economically. Still not developed, the government of the Republic has no local authority. At the same time, Yemen's northern population, including Sa'da, is dominated by Zaydis believers, and has long been at odds with the Sunni-dominated south. Although President Saleh, who united Yemen, was from the Zaid faction in the north (formerly the Arab Republic of Yemen), he used the power of neighboring Saudi Arabia in the 1994 civil war to defeat the separatist forces in the south, while the Zaid faction After the war complained that the Saleh government allowed the Wahhabis, who dominate Saudi Arabia, to have too much say in Yemen.

In 2004, an insurgency against Saleh's government spearheaded in Sa'ada, led by the Houthi movement. The Houthi movement, formerly known as "Youth of Beliefs", was founded in 1992 in Saada province by Hassan Badr al-Din Al-Houthi, a religious and military leader from the Sadazaid Houthi tribe. Hassan Houthi, a former member of the Yemen House of Representatives and an opponent of Saleh's government, began preparing an armed rebellion against the government in 2004. But on September 1 of that year, he was killed in battle between Sa'ada province and Yemen government forces. Afterwards, followers of Hassan Houthi changed the name of the "Youth of Beliefs" organization to "Houthi Movement" (the official name was changed to "Ansar Allah Movement", which means the devotees of Allah) to commemorate him forever. Since then, the conflict between the Houthi movement and the Saleh government has been intermittent until the two sides signed a ceasefire agreement in 2010.

At the beginning of 2011, when the upheaval sweeping the Arab world was in the ascendant, Yemen protested against President Saleh's attempt to amend the constitution and re-elected after 32 years in power (because of the "Dignity Judah" event that year was also called For the "Revolution of Dignity"), the Houthis also took the opportunity to make a comeback and the rebellion re-emerged. On February 27 of that year, Abdul-Malik al-Houthi, a leader of the Houthi movement from the Saada region and brother of the late leader Hassan Houthi, announced his support for anti-government demonstrators. In February and March of that year, thousands of protesters marched weekly in Saada from the old city gate to the barracks of government security forces. On March 18 (Friday, Sunday), government snipers opened fire on crowds participating in a large-scale protest in the capital, Sana, causing a large number of casualties. The actions of the government forces have sparked nationwide outrage and a large number of government members defecting on a day known as "Dignity Lord's Day". On March 19, in response to the previous day's "Journal of Dignity", Houthi fighters entered the city of Sa'ada and the Battle of Sa'ada began. The Houthis fought fiercely with the armed forces of Sheikh Ottoman Mujali, a pro-government tribal leader in the city, and took control of the city on March 24. Hajar and members of the local government fled to the capital, Sanaa, and Houthi fighters set up military checkpoints at the entrance to Saada city. On March 26, the Houthis appointed Faris Manaa, a top arms dealer in the Middle East and a former ally of President Saleh, as the new governor of Saada Province, and announced the establishment of a government agency that was completely independent of the central government in Sanaa. The new government of Sa'ada has made Sa'ada the first city to break away from the central government since the Yemen crisis that continues to this day.

Sadda has been under the control of the Houthis since the end of the Saddam campaign. In March 2015, the Houthis, which had taken control of the capital Sanaa and established itself in the center, announced that they would overthrow the remnants of Hadi's government that had fled to the south to unify the country, triggering a new civil war. In the new civil war, Saada, the home of the Houthis, was hit by airstrikes by the Saudi-led coalition of Arab forces that intervened in Yemen's civil war. According to the report of the United Nations Educational, Scientific and Cultural Organization, the ancient city of Saada, which has been included in the "World Heritage Tentative List", was attacked by air strikes. The air strikes hit the Imam Hadi Mosque in the ancient city of Sa'ada, and the mosque was severely damaged. The mosque is the oldest Shiite mosque in the Arabian Peninsula and the third oldest in Yemen.

Geography
The northwestern mountainous area of Yemen where Sadar is located is the Serat (Sarawat) Mountain area, which belongs to the remnants of the Asir Mountains (southern Hejaz Mountains) extending southward to Yemen, adjacent to Yemen. The plateau area in the northeastern part of the gate, close to the core of the Arabian desert region, the Rub al-Khali Desert, generally belongs to the tropical desert climate (Köppen climate classification: BWh), hot, dry and water-deficient, mainly animal husbandry. From a geological point of view, the northern area of the central Yemen mountains where Saada is located is a horst formed by crystalline rocks.

Sa'dah has a hot desert climate (Köppen climate classification: BWh). 

Sa'da is the birthplace of the Zaid sect of Yemen's Shiite sect. The residents are mainly Arab Muslims who believe in the Zaid sect, but it was also one of the main settlements of Yemen Jews in history. Between the 17th and 20th centuries, Jews gathered in large numbers in Yemen, including Saada. At the beginning of the 19th century, there were about 1,000 Jews in the city of Saddah. To this day, Israel has been able to consolidate its special influence over the country, and to the same extent Saada, by virtue of the influence of the Jews in Yemen. The Jews, as merchants and craftsmen, especially silversmiths, influenced the fate of Saada economically, thus contributing to the sustainable construction and development of the city.

Today, the tribes around Saada determine the fate of the city. Every Sunday, you can buy carrots, carpets, silverware, electronic equipment and many other goods at Saada's market (Sunday Market). Saada is one of Yemen's main mass market cities, with four bazaars.

In 2004, Saada had an estimated population of 51,870 (49,422 according to official statistics), making it the tenth largest city in Yemen at the time. [1] In 2013, Saada's population was estimated at 70,203 people.

Transportation
There is Saada Airport in the northwest of Saada (IATA code: SYE; ICAO code: OYSH), which has a runway of about 3,000 meters long and has no scheduled passenger flights. Saada Airport is one of Yemen's main airports operating domestic routes. Saada has a road leading to the capital Sanaa through Amran province. During the civil war in North Yemen, the monarchist armed forces cut off this road several times to prevent the republican control of Saada and Sanaa between the two places. contact. There are also cross-border highways in Saada to Dhahran in Asir Province, Saudi Arabia, and cross-border highways to Najran, the capital of Najran Province, Saudi Arabia.

Culture
Saada is one of the oldest medieval cities in Yemen and is of great significance to Yemen's historical, architectural, urban and spiritual values. Saada has been a stronghold of the Zaydis since the city was founded by Imam Hadi Yahya in the late 9th century. The ancient city of Sada has been prosperous for a long time. The buildings in the city continue to follow the architectural style of the Middle Ages without interruption, and have a very typical land structure that represents the entire region. The wall of the ancient city of Saada is about 3,000 meters long and 4 meters thick. There are 52 watchtowers and 16 city gates on the city wall, the most famous of which are "Yemen Gate" and "Najlan Gate". There is an iron ore slag mountain in the city, the remnants of the mine artisan workshops are centuries old, and a fortress from the 16th to 18th centuries was built on the hill.

The Zaydis Muslim Cemetery outside the ancient city of Sa’da is the largest and oldest cemetery in Yemen, with countless elaborately carved tombstones erected on the cemetery. Outside the "Yemen Gate", there is an ancient cistern, and there are huge rocks with Neolithic carvings of now-extinct wild animals, as well as ibex and human figures, which are Yemen The oldest rock carving. There are also four fortresses built outside the ancient city of Saada to guard the city: the three fortresses of Turmus, Alsama, Sinara, and the fortress of Abra rebuilt by the Ottoman Turks. Ten small villages in the valley outside the city, with beautiful houses surrounded by farmland, vineyards and fruit trees.

There are 14 mosques built in the 10th century to the 16th century in the ancient city, among which the Imam Hadi Mosque buries the first Zaydis Imam Hadi and his 11 successors. It is the oldest in the Arabian Peninsula. Shia mosque and the third oldest mosque in Yemen, it was heavily damaged in an airstrike in May 2015. Hadi Mosque and Nisari Mosque are both considered high-level educational and religious sites, and have undeniable architectural value; various domes of mosques in Saada city The style of the minaret is rare and beautiful; in addition, there is a mosque in the city for women to worship.

Gallery

Notable people 

 Ameen Jubran, born 1984, founder of Jeel Albena Association for Humanitarian Development

References

External links

 Encyclopædia Britannica

Populated places in Saada Governorate